Oceano Andrade da Cruz (born 29 July 1962), known simply as Oceano, is a Portuguese former professional footballer, currently a manager.

A defensive midfielder with tremendous physical strength and leadership skills as his main assets, he was widely regarded as the best footballer ever hailing from Cape Verde, and represented most notably Sporting CP, appearing in more than 400 official matches for the club over 11 seasons (two separate spells).

Having earned more than 50 caps for Portugal, Oceano played with his adopted nation at Euro 1996.

Club career
Born in São Vicente, Cape Verde, Oceano's family immigrated to Portugal when he was a child. He started his career at Almada A.C. in the lower leagues and, after spells in the second division with Odivelas F.C. and C.D. Nacional, signed with Sporting CP for the 1984–85 season.

Oceano was an undisputed starter for the Lisbon side during his stay, which consisted at first of seven seasons. In 1991, he moved alongside compatriot and teammate Carlos Xavier to Spain's Real Sociedad, where the pair was equally influential, having been reunited with former Sporting boss John Toshack.

Both Oceano and Xavier returned to the Lions in the summer of 1994, and the former continued to perform at a consistent level until the end of the 1997–98 campaign, when he was almost 36; his Sporting trophies consisted, however, of a single Taça de Portugal, in 1995. He wrapped up his career in 1999, after a stint in France with Toulouse FC.

After retiring, Oceano worked as a color commentator for several TV networks. In early March 2011, he returned to his main club Sporting, joining newly appointed José Couceiro's coaching staff; exactly one year after, he moved in the same capacity to U.D. Leiria under another old Sporting acquaintance, José Dominguez.

Oceano started the 2012–13 season in charge of Sporting's reserves in the Segunda Liga. On 4 October 2012, however, following Ricardo Sá Pinto's dismissal, he was named caretaker manager of the first team.

Oceano's tenure as head coach of Sporting first consisted of three away games and losses – against FC Porto in the league (2–0), against Moreirense F.C. in the domestic cup (3–2) and at K.R.C. Genk in the UEFA Europa League group stage (2–1)– and his spell ended on 29 October 2012 with a 0–0 home draw with Académica de Coimbra in the national championship.

International career
Oceano played 54 times for Portugal, scoring eight goals. His debut came on 30 January 1985 in a 2–3 friendly defeat to Romania, and his last game occurred thirteen years later in a 0–3 loss against England on 22 April 1998. He was a leading presence in the national team throughout the 1990s, notably at UEFA Euro 1996 where he helped them to the quarter-finals.

Following the Portuguese Football Federation's appointment of Carlos Queiroz in July 2008, Oceano took up a position within the scouting department. He worked alongside former Porto's José Alberto Costa and former IFA Premiership player Julian Ward.

In August 2009, Oceano was appointed head coach of Portugal under-21s, succeeding Rui Caçador. His first match was on the 11th, a 2–1 win over Northern Ireland.

After failing to qualify for the 2011 European Championship, Oceano was dismissed from his position. In late March 2014 he again reunited with Queiroz, joining his coaching staff at the Iranian national side prior to the 2014 FIFA World Cup tournament. On 20 February 2019, the pair started working with Colombia.

Managerial statistics

References

External links

1962 births
Living people
People from São Vicente, Cape Verde
Cape Verdean emigrants to Portugal
Portuguese sportspeople of Cape Verdean descent
Black Portuguese sportspeople
Cape Verdean footballers
Portuguese footballers
Association football midfielders
Primeira Liga players
Liga Portugal 2 players
Odivelas F.C. players
C.D. Nacional players
Sporting CP footballers
La Liga players
Real Sociedad footballers
Ligue 1 players
Toulouse FC players
Portugal international footballers
UEFA Euro 1996 players
Cape Verdean expatriate footballers
Portuguese expatriate footballers
Expatriate footballers in Spain
Expatriate footballers in France
Portuguese expatriate sportspeople in Spain
Portuguese expatriate sportspeople in France
Cape Verdean football managers
Portuguese football managers
Primeira Liga managers
Liga Portugal 2 managers
Sporting CP B managers
Sporting CP managers
Portuguese expatriate sportspeople in Iran
Portuguese expatriate sportspeople in Colombia